A Bachelor of Applied Science (BAS or BASc) is an undergraduate academic degree of applied sciences.

Usage

In Canada, the Netherlands and other places the Bachelor of Applied Science (BASc) is equivalent to the Bachelor of Engineering, and is classified as a professional degree. In Australia and New Zealand this degree is awarded in various fields of study and is considered a highly specialized professional degree. In the United States, it is also considered a highly specialized professional technical degree; the Bachelor of Applied Science is an applied baccalaureate, typically containing advanced technical training (e.g. military training) in sciences combined with liberal arts that traditional degrees do not have. All the general education courses are valid courses if taken at accredited universities and colleges that have regional accreditation. Hence, an earned BAS degree does include having to take upper-division coursework as required in addition to traditional bachelor's degree programs.

The Bachelor of Applied Science (BAS) degree is designed to grow professional management skills of the learner and meet the demand for leadership of highly technical professionals in the workplace. A Bachelor of Applied Science (BAS) degree requires an Associate of Applied Science (AAS) degree, a minimum of 4 years of professional development or additional classes in an approved field,  professional certifications or approved military training, and 2 years of upper level college courses. This degree takes longer than a basic traditional degree because of the specialized technical skill level and professional development requirements. Most people who pursue this degree are already experienced professional adults who are working towards an advanced graduate degree or interested in upward mobility in their field.

The AAS is historically considered a technical degree in the United States. An accredited AAS degree is a 2 to 3-year degree that articulates well with advanced academics and/or approved technical programs. A high school diploma and entry level testing is necessary for college acceptance. The AAS provides opportunities for advanced learning through 4-year undergraduate studies in approved fields that will transfer to an accredited BAS program.

On 20 February 2009 the Dutch Minister of Education, Culture and Science, Ronald Plasterk, proposed to replace all the existing degrees offered by Dutch vocational universities, such as the BBA, BEd and BEng, with the BAA and the BASc. But, the BAS has taken the official degree term in the United States.

The Bachelor of Applied Science (BAS) degrees are designed to enhance the occupational/technical education provided by an Associate of Applied Science (AAS) or Associate of Applied Technology (AAT) degree program.

Fields of study

The BAS usually requires a student to take a majority of their courses in the applied sciences, specializing in a specific area such as the following:

 Agricultural systems
 Applied physics
 Applied mathematics
 Architectural science
 General engineering
 Automotive engineering
 Building Arts
 Biological engineering
 Biochemical engineering
 Built Environment
 Business informatics
 Chemical engineering
 Civil engineering
 Computer science
 Computer engineering
 Communication
 Construction Management
 Criminal justice
 Criminology
 Electrical engineering
 Environmental engineering
 Geomatics
 Occupational health and safety
 Public health
 Engineering management
 Engineering physics
 Engineering science
 Engineering science and mechanics
 Geological engineering
 Hospitality Management
 Industrial engineering
 Information management
 Integrated engineering
 Information systems
 Information technology
 Management engineering
 Management of technology
 Manufacturing engineering
 Manufacturing Management
 Materials science & engineering
 Mechanical engineering
 Mechanical engineering technology
 Mechatronics engineering
 Mining engineering
 Microbiology
 Nanotechnology engineering
 Nutrition and Food
 Paralegal Studies
 Forensics
 Astrophysics
 Professional Technical Teacher Education
 Project Management
 Property and Valuation
 Software engineering
 Sound engineering
 Surveying
 Sustainable building science technology
 Systems engineering
 Regional and Urban Planning
 Applied physics & electronic engineering
 Business management
 Social science
 Leadership

See also
 Bachelor of Applied Arts
 Bachelor of Applied Arts and Sciences
 Bachelor of Arts
 Bachelor of Science
 Bachelor of Science in Information Technology
 Bachelor's degree

References

Bachelor's degrees